Rock 'n' Roll Dudes is the second album by the English band The Glitter Band, released in 1975 on the Bell record label. It reached No. 17 on the UK Albums Chart.

Track listing
Side one
"For Always and Ever" (John Springate, John Rossall)
"Sweet Baby Blue" (John Springate)
"I Can't Stop" (John Springate)
"Write Me a Letter" (Gerry Shephard, Pete Phipps)
"All My Love" (Pete Phipps)
"Goodbye My Love" (Gerry Shephard)

Side two
"Game Up" (Gerry Shephard, John Springate, Eddie Seago)
"Bring Her Back" (Gerry Shephard, John Springate)
"Pictures of You" (Gerry Shephard, Pete Phipps)
"Do You Remember" (Gerry Shephard, John Rossall)
"You're Trying Too Hard" (Harvey Ellison)
"Let's Get Together Again" (Gerry Shephard, John Rossall)

Charts

Personnel
 Gerry Shephard - guitars, lead (4, 5, 7, 9-12) and backing vocals
 Harvey Ellison - saxophones
 John Rossall - saxophones
 John Springate - bass, lead (1-3, 6, 8) and backing vocals
 Pete Phipps - drums, backing vocals, piano

Production
Produced by Mike Leander in Paris and London for G.T.O. Productions
Sound Supervision by John Hudson
Album cover photography by J. Trapman
Album sleeve design by MLT Marketing Associates.

References

1975 albums
The Glitter Band albums
Bell Records albums